Santragachi Junction railway station (station code: SRC) is a railway junction in South Eastern Railway Zone of Indian Railways, situated in Santragachhi, Howrah, India. It is one of five intercity railway stations serving Howrah and Kolkata. The station is operated by Indian Railways South Eastern Railway (SER) zone. SER serves local trains to Amta, Mecheda, Panskura, Haldia, Kharagpur and Medinipur and mail/express trains to Central, West and South India.

Whilst the station had existed for many years on the line to Howrah railway station, further development was started to upgrade it to a railway terminal in 2015. SER wished to use it for their long-distance trains which would otherwise have to go to the crowded Howrah station which is operated by Eastern Railway.

Incidents
In 2018 two people died due to a stampede at the railway station.

Electric loco shed
Santragachi Electric Loco Shed holds WAP-4 & WAP-7 class locomotives.

Currently SRC ELS holding 89 electric locomotives: 35 WAP-4 & 54 WAP-7.

Gallery

References 

Railway stations in Howrah district
Railway junction stations in West Bengal
Kharagpur railway division
Kolkata Suburban Railway stations
Rail transport in Howrah